Malcolm D. Smith (born 25 May 1959) is a former Australian rules footballer who played with St Kilda in the Victorian Football League (VFL).

A Beaumaris recruit, Smith played one league match for St Kilda, which came in the final round of the 1982 VFL season, an 88-point loss to Hawthorn. Smith had nine disposals.

He is the father of Sydney footballer Nick Smith.

References

1959 births
Australian rules footballers from Victoria (Australia)
St Kilda Football Club players
Living people